The Connecticut Financial Center is the tallest building in New Haven, Connecticut, and the sixth tallest building in the state. The 383 foot postmodern skyscraper was designed by the Toronto architectural firm Crang and Boake and completed in 1990. It is adjacent to New Haven City Hall facing the New Haven Green in Downtown New Haven. Among the current tenants of the building are United Illuminating, Bank of America, Merrill Lynch, the U.S. Attorney’s Office, U.S. Bankruptcy Court, and the Social Security Administration’s Office of Hearings and Appeals. The CFC stands on the former site of the Powell Building, which was New Haven's first skyscraper.

See also
List of tallest buildings in Connecticut
List of tallest buildings in New Haven

References

1990 establishments in Connecticut
Skyscraper office buildings in Connecticut
Skyscrapers in New Haven, Connecticut
Postmodern architecture in the United States
Office buildings completed in 1990